First Descent is a 2005 documentary film about snowboarding and its beginning in the 1980s.

The snowboarders featured in this movie (Shawn Farmer, Nick Perata, Terje Haakonsen, Hannah Teter and Shaun White with guest appearances from Travis Rice) represent three generations of snowboarders and the progress this young sport has made over the past two decades. Most of the movie was shot in Alaska and its back country.

It is the first movie to be produced and financed by the soft-drink company Mountain Dew.

Credits
 Kemp Curly - producer, editor
 Kevin Harrison - producer, director
 Marc Joubert - co-producer
 John Kaplan - co-producer
 Jack Kelly - coordinating producer
 Paula Martone - line producer
 Larry Tanz - executive producer

See also
 Step Into Liquid

Notes

External links

2005 films
Snowboarding
Universal Pictures films
Films shot in Alaska
2000s English-language films